Behind Enemy Lines is the debut album by the Christian metalcore band, Saving Grace. It is the only album the band released signed under the label Harvest Earth Records.

Critical reception

Reception for the album has been generally positive, though its tendency to veer into predictability has been pointed out.

Christian music website, New Release Tuesday praised the album, calling it "Bold, brutal and 100 percent in your face... an album which will have hardcore and metal kids alike craving more." Erik Thomas of Lastrites wrote "this kind of stuff has been done to death, but this is definitely one of the better examples I've heard, even more so considering the origin". Sputnik Music commented that though the album falls into the trap of being too repetitive, as is often the case with its genre, "this is a great band and album...the best part are the lyrics that advise listeners to believe in themselves no matter what."

Track listing

Credits
Saving Grace
 Nicholas Tauthi - Vocals
 Vasely Sapanov - Guitar
 George White - Bass
 Benjamin Davidson - Drums
Production
 Colin Davis - Mastering
 Dave Quiggle - Artwork

References

2008 albums
Saving Grace (band) albums